Bill W. Stacy is an American educator and university administrator. He was the founding president of California State University San Marcos from 1989 to 1997, and served as chancellor of the University of Tennessee at Chattanooga from 1997 to 2004.

Early life and education
Stacy is from Bristol, Tennessee. His education is in speech communication, with a bachelor's degree from Southeast Missouri State University and masters and doctors degrees from Southern Illinois University.

Career
He was president of Southeast Missouri State University in Cape Girardeau, Missouri from 1979 to 1989.

In 1989 he was hired to be the first president of the new California State University campus in the northern area of San Diego County, California. A site had been purchased in 1988. Stacy was tasked with recruiting a dozen faculty members, defining the mission for the new university, and establishing an initial nine majors. He also had to supervise the construction of the new university campus. It was the nation's first new state university in more than 20 years.

Ground was broken in early 1990. That fall the university admitted its first 448 students, all junior and senior transfers, with classes held in an office building that had been used as a satellite campus for San Diego State University. In 1992 the new campus opened and the university held its first commencement ceremony. By the time he left in 1997 the university had a student body of 4,400 and offered 19 bachelor's degrees, 15 teacher credentials, and eight master's degrees.

In 1997 he became the chancellor at the University of Tennessee at Chattanooga, serving until 2004.

From 2004 until 2009 he served as headmaster of the Baylor School in Chattanooga.

Personal life
He is married to Dr. Sue Stacy, an educator who has taught at multiple universities and has authored several textbooks on microcomputer applications. She received her master's degree from the University of Missouri and her PhD from Georgia State University. In 2013 the two of them were jointly awarded the Outstanding Service Award from the University of Tennessee at Chattanooga.

References

Living people
People from Chattanooga, Tennessee
Southeast Missouri State University alumni
Southern Illinois University alumni
Presidents of California State University, San Marcos
University of Tennessee at Chattanooga people
Year of birth missing (living people)